Marino Charles Intrieri (September 13, 1907– February 5, 1969) was an American football guard in the National Football League (NFL) for the Staten Island Stapletons and the Boston Redskins. Born in Steelton, Pennsylvania, he attended Loyola College in Maryland.

References

External links
 
 

1907 births
1969 deaths
American football guards
Boston Redskins players
Loyola Greyhounds football players
Millersville Marauders football coaches
Staten Island Stapletons players
Sportspeople from Harrisburg, Pennsylvania
Players of American football from Harrisburg, Pennsylvania